Sonie Rajbhandari is a Nepalese model & beauty queen. She was crowned Miss Nepal International 2014 on 2 May 2014. Sonie graduated from Kathmandu University School of Management, with a major in Business Management.

Miss Nepal - 2014
Sonie Rajbhandari was selected as Miss Pokhara 2014 which gave her the chance to represent her hometown, Pokhara at the Miss Nepal 2014 beauty pageant, where she finished as second runner-up. Sonie represented Nepal at the Miss International 2014 beauty pageant in Japan. 

On 5 April 2015, the Hidden Treasure company announced the withdrawal of the original first runner-up Miss Nepal Earth 2014 - Prinsha Shrestha for violating the rules of the competition. This led Sonie to become the new Miss Nepal Earth 2014 just 2 weeks before the grand finale of Miss Nepal 2015.

In 2016, Sonie managed to raise $10,000 for the April 2015 Nepal earthquake Charity Relief in Nepal.

References

Miss Nepal winners
Living people
Nepalese female models
Nepalese beauty pageant winners
1989 births
Miss International 2014 delegates
People from Pokhara